The Scott Moncrieff Prize, named after the translator C. K. Scott Moncrieff, is an annual £2,000 literary prize for French to English translation, awarded to one or more translators every year for a full-length work deemed by the Translators Association to have "literary merit". Only translations first published in the United Kingdom are considered for the accolade.

Sponsors of the prize include the French Ministry of Culture, the French Embassy, and the Arts Council of England.

Winners

2020's 
2022

 Winner: Sarah Ardizzone for a translation of Men Don’t Cry by Faïza Guène (Cavassa Republic Press)
 Runner Up: Lara Vergnaud for a translation The Ardent Swarm by Yamen Manai (Amazon Crossing)

Shortlisted:

 Chris Andrews for a translation of A Bookshop in Algiers by Kaouther Adimi (Serpent’s Tail)
 Frank Wynne for a translation of The Art of Losing by Alice Zeniter (Pan Macmillan and Picador)
 Sheila Fischman for a translation of Em by Kim Thúy (Seven Stories Press)

2021

 Winner: Sam Taylor for a translation of The Invisible Land by Hubert Mingarelli (Granta)
 Runner up: Emily Boyce for a translation of A Long Way Off by Pascal Garnier (Gallic Books)

Shortlisted:

 Helen Stevenson for a translation of The Death of Comrade President by Alain Mabanckou (Profile Books: Serpent’s Tail)
 Roland Glasser for a translation of Real Life by Adeline Dieudonné (World Editions)
 Laura Marris for a translation of Those Who Forget by Géraldine Schwarz (Pushkin Press)
 Aneesa Abbas Higgins for a translation of Winter in Sokcho by Elisa Shua Dusapin (Daunt Books Publishing)

2020 (presented 2021)

 Winner: Aneesa Abbas Higgins for a translation of A Girl Called Eel by Ali Zamir (Jacarada Books)
 Runner-up: Frank Wynne for a translation of Animalia by Jean-Baptiste del Amo (Fitzcarraldo Editions)

Shortlisted:

Geoffrey Strachan for a translation of The Archipelago of Another Life by Andreï Makine (MacLehose Press)

 Jordan Stump for a translation of The Cheffe by Marie NDiaye (MacLehose Press) 
 Mark Hutchinson for a translation of The Governesses by Anne Serre (Les Fugitives) 
 Natasha Lehrer for a translation of Memories of Low Tide by Chantal Thomas (Pushkin Press)

2010's
2019 (presented 2020)

 Winner: Linda Coverdale for a translation of The Old Slave and the Mastiff by Patrick Chamoiseau (Dialogue Books)
Runner-up: David Warriner for a translation of We Were the Salt of the Sea by Roxanne Bouchard (Orenda Books)

Shortlisted:

 Penny Hueston for a translation of Our Life in the Forest by Marie Darrieussecq (Text Publishing)
 Adriana Hunter for a translation of Woman at Sea by Catherine Poulain (Jonathan Cape)
 Tina Kover for a translation of Disoriental by Négar Djavadi (Europa Editions)
 Geoffrey Strachan for a translation of Tropic of Violence by Nathacha Appanah (MacLehose Press)

2018 (presented 2019)
Winner: Sophie Yanow for her translation of Pretending is Lying by Dominique Goblet (New York Review Comics)
 Runner-up: Frank Wynne for his translation of Vernon Subutex 1 by Virginie Despentes (MacLehose Press/Quercus)

Shortlistees: 
 Aneesa Abbas Higgins for her translation of Seven Stones by Vénus Khoury-Ghata (Jacaranda Books)
 Sophie Lewis for her translation of Blue Self-Portrait by Noémi Lefebvre (Les Fugitives)
 Helen Stevenson for her translation of Black Moses by Alain Mabanckou (Profile Books)

2017 (presented 2018)
 Winner: Will McMorran and Thomas Wynn for their translation of The 120 Days of Sodom by the Marquis de Sade (Penguin Classics)
 Commended: Antony Melville for his translation of Anicet or the Panorama by Louis Aragon (Atlas Press)

2016 (presented 2017)
 Winner: Natasha Lehrer and Cécile Menon for their translation of Suite for Barbara Loden by Nathalie Léger (Les Fugitives)
 Commended: Sophie Lewis for her translation of Héloïse is Bald by Émilie du Turckheim (Jonathan Cape)

2015 (presented 2016)
 Winner: Frank Wynne for his translation of Harraga by Boualem Sansal (Bloomsbury) 
 Commended: David Bellos for his translation Portrait of a Man by Georges Perec (MacLehose Press)

2014
 Winner: Rachel Galvin for her translation of Hitting the Streets by Raymond Queneau (Carcanet Press)
 Commended: Lulu Norman for her translation of Horses of God by Mahi Binebine (Granta)

2013
 Winner: Beverley Bie Brahic for her translation of The Little Auto by Guillaume Apollinaire (CB Editions)
 Commended: Euan Cameron for his translation of A Journey to Nowhere - Detours and Riddles in the Lands and History of Courland by Jean-Paul Kauffman (MacLehose Press)

2012
 Winner: Malcolm Imrie for his translation of Fear by Gabriel Chevallier (Serpent's Tail)
 Commended: Giles MacDonogh for his translation of Testicles by Blandine Vié (Prospect Books)

2011
 Winner: Adriana Hunter for Beside the Sea by Véronique Olmi (Peirene)
 Runners-up: Sarah Ardizzone for her translation of Daniel Pennac’s School Blues (Maclehose Press) and Frank Wynne for his translation of Boualem Sansal’s An Unfinished Business (Bloomsbury)

2010
 Winner: Susan Wicks for Cold Spring in Winter by Valérie Rouzeau (Arc Publications)
 Joint runners-up: Linda Coverdale for The Strategy of Antelopes by Jean Hatzfeld (Serpent’s Tail) and Lazer Lederhendler for Nikolski by Nicolas Dickner (Portobello)

2000s
2009
 Winner: Polly McLean for Gross Margin by Laurent Quintreau (Harvill Secker)
 Runner up: Barbara Mellor for Resistance: Memoirs of Occupied France by Agnes Humbert (Bloomsbury)

2008
 Winner: Frank Wynne for Holiday in a Coma and Love Lasts Three Years by Frédéric Beigbeder (Fourth Estate)
 Runner up: John Brownjohn for Elizabeth 1st and Mary Stuart by Anka Muhlstein (Haus Books)

2007
 Winner: Sarah Adams for Just Like Tomorrow by Faïza Guène (Chatto)
 Runner up: Geoffrey Strachan for The Woman who Waited by Andrei Makine (Sceptre)

2006
 Winner: Linda Coverdale for A Time for Machetes by Jean Hatzfeld (Serpent’s Tail)
 Runner up: Anthea Bell for Love Without Resistance by Gilles Rozier (Little, Brown)

2005
 Winner: John Berger and Lisa Appignanesi for The Year is '42 by Nella Bielski (Bloomsbury)

2004
 Winner: Ian Monk for Monsieur Malaussene by Daniel Pennac (Harvill)

2003
 Winner: Linda Asher for Ignorance by Milan Kundera (Faber and Faber)

2002
 Winner: Ina Rilke for Balzac and the Little Chinese Seamstress by Dai Sijie (Chatto & Windus)

2001
 Winner: Barbara Bray for On Identity by Amin Maalouf (Harvill)

2000
 Winner: Patricia Clancy for The Dark Room at Longwood by Jean-Paul Kauffmann (Harvill)

1990s
1999
 Winner: Margaret Mauldon for Against Nature by Joris-Karl Huysmans (OUP)

1998
 Winner: Geoffrey Strachan for Le Testament Francais by Andreï Makine (Sceptre)

1997
 Winners: Janet Lloyd for The Spears of Twlight by Philippe Descola (Harper Collins)

and Christopher Hampton for Art by Yasmina Reza (Faber and Faber)

1996
 Winner: David Coward for Belle du Seigneur by Albert Cohen (Viking)

1995
 Winner: Gilbert Adair for A Void by Georges Perec (Harvill)

1994
No Award

1993
 Winner: Christine Donougher for The Book of Nights by Sylvie Germain (Dedalus)

1992
 Winners: Barbara Wright for The Midnight Love Feast by Michel Tournier (Collins)

and James Kirkup for Painted Shadows by Jean Baptiste-Niel (Quartet)

1991
 Winner: Brian Pearce for Bread and Circuses by Paul Veyne (Penguin)

1990
 Winner: Beryl and John Fletcher for The Georgics by Claude Simon (Calder)

1980s
1989
 Winner: Derek Mahon for Selected Poems by Philippe Jaccotet (Viking Penguin)

1988
 Winner: Robyn Marsack for The Scorpion-Fish by Nicolas Bouvier (Carcanet)

1987
 Winner: Barbara Wright for Grabinoulor by Pierre Albert-Birot (Atlas)

1986
 Winners: Barbara Bray for The Lover by Marguerite Duras (Collins)

and Richard Nice for Distinction by Pierre Bourdieu (Routledge)

1985
 Winner: Quintin Hoare for War Diaries: Notebooks from a Phoney War by Jean-Paul Sartre (Verso)
 Runner up: Barbara Wright for Childhood by Nathalie Sarraute (Calder)

1984
 Winner: Roy Harris for Course in General Linguistics by F. de Saussure (Duckworth)

1983
 Winner: Sian Reynolds for The Wheels of Commerce by Fernand Braudel (Collins)

1982
 Winner: Anne Carter for Gemini by Michel Tournier (Collins)

1981
 Winner: Paul Falla for The World of the Citizen in Republican Rome by C. Nicolet (Batsford)

1980
 Winner: Brian Pearce for The Institutions of France under the Absolute Monarchy 1598-1789 by Roland Mousnier (University of Chicago Press)

1970s
1979
 Winner: John and Doreen Weightman for The Origin of Table Manners by Claude Levi-Strauss (Jonathan Cape)

and Richard Mayne for Memoirs (Collins)

1978
 Winner: Janet Lloyd for The Gardens of Adonis by Marcel Detienne (Harvester Press)

and David Hapgood for The Totalitarian Temptation by Jean-Francois Revel (Secker & Warburg)

1977
 Winner: Peter Wait for French Society 1789-1970 by George Dupeux (Methuen)

1976
 Winner: Brian Pearce for Leninism under Lenin by Marcel Liebman (Jonathan Cape)

and Douglas Parmee for The Second World War by Henri Michel (Andre Deutsch)

1975
 Winners: D. McN. Lockie for France in the Age of Louis XIII & Richelieu by Victor-L Tapie (Macmillan)

and Joanna Kilmartin for Scars on the Soul by Francoise Sagan (Andre Deutsch)

1974
 Winner: John and Doreen Weightman for From Honey to Ashes by Claude Levi-Strauss (Collins) and Tristes Tropiques by Claude Levi-Strauss (Jonathan Cape)

1973
 Winner: Barbara Bray for The Erl King by Michel Tournier (Collins)

1972
 Winner: Paul Stevenson for Germany in our Time by Alfred Grosser (Pall Mall Press)
 Special Awards: Joanna Kilmartin for Sunlight on Cold Water by Francois Sagan (Weidenfeld & Nicolson), and Elizabeth Walter for A Scent of Lilies by Claire Gallois (Collins)

1971
 Winner: Maria Jolas for Between Life and Death by Nathalie Sarraute (Calder & Boyars)
 Runner-up: Jean Stewart for Maltaverne by Francois Mauriac (Eyre & Spottiswoode) and The Taking of the Bastille by Jacques Godechot (Faber and Faber)

1970
 Winner: W.G. Corp for The Spaniard by Bernard Clavel (Harrap)
 Richard Barry for The Suez Expedition 1956 by Andre Beaufre (Faber)
 Elaine P. Halperin for The Other Side of the Mountain by Michel Bernanos (Gollancz)

1960s
1969
 Winner: Terence Kilmartin for Anti-memoirs by Andre Malraux (Hamish Hamilton) and The Girls by Henry de Montherlant (Weidenfeld & Nicolson)
 Special Award: Anthony Rudolf for Selected Poems by Yves Bonnefoy (Jonathan Cape)

1968
 Winner: Jean Stewart for French North Africa by Jacques Berque (Faber)

1967
 Winner: John and Doreen Weightman for Jean Jacques Rousseau by Jean Guehenno (Routledge & Kegan Paul)

1966
 Winners: Barbara Bray for From Tristram to Yorick by Henri Fluchero (OUP) and Peter Wiles for A Young Trouti by Roger Vailland (Collins)

1965
 Winner: Edward Hyams for Joan of Arc (Regino Iornoud Macdonald)
 Runner-up: Humphrey Hare for Memoirs of Zeus by Maurice Druon (Hart-Davis)

References

External links 

Translation awards
Society of Authors awards
Awards established in 1965
1965 establishments in the United Kingdom